Svanberga is a locality in Norrtälje Municipality, Stockholm County, Sweden. It had 501 inhabitants in 2010.

Climate
Svanberga has a humid continental climate (Köppen Dfb). It is located in a frost hollow and is prone to very cold temperatures in winter, often in brief spells, with highly variable patterns. In spring air frosts linger on until early May, while summer highs are quite warm.

References 

Populated places in Norrtälje Municipality